Mirny (lit. peaceful) is a closed town in the west of Arkhangelsk Oblast, Russia, serving the Plesetsk Cosmodrome. Gorodskaya railway station is located within the town, being a terminus to cosmodrome's vast railway system. The Plestsy Airport is also located nearby. Population:

Location and geography
The area administered by the town borders with Kholmogorsky District in the north, Vinogradovsky District in the east, and Plesetsky District in the south and in the west. The town proper is located in the extreme southwestern end of the area. The Yemtsa River flows in the north of the area, whereas the Mekhrenga River crosses it south to north in the eastern part. The whole area belongs to the Northern Dvina River basin. Except for the military installations, it is covered by coniferous forest (taiga).

History
In 1957, an area for the settlement for ballistic missile launch site workers was designated. In 1958, the population of the area, about 4,000, was resettled; the same year the construction started. On November 23, 1960 the settlement of Mirny was established. In 1966, with the development of the cosmodrome, it was designated a closed town. Mirny was never mentioned in the media before 1983.

Administrative and municipal status
Within the framework of administrative divisions, it is incorporated as the town of oblast significance of Mirny—an administrative unit with the status equal to that of the districts. As a municipal division, the town of oblast significance of Mirny is incorporated as Mirny Urban Okrug.

References

Notes

Sources

External links
  
 Official website of Mirny

Cities and towns in Arkhangelsk Oblast
Cities and towns built in the Soviet Union
Populated places established in 1957
Naukograds